Kieron Conway (born 2 May 1996) is an English professional boxer who challenged  for the British super-welterweight title in 2019.

Professional career
Conway made his professional debut on 25 February 2017, scoring a four-round points decision (PTS) victory against Sonny Whiting at the Civic Hall in Bedworth, Warwickshire.

After scoring five more wins, two by stoppage, he defeated Chris Monaghan via seventh-round technical knockout (TKO) to capture the British Challenge middleweight title on 9 March 2018 at The Deco in Northampton.

Following another three wins, he participated in the Ultimate Boxxer III tournament on 10 May 2019 at the indigo at The O2. Conway won his first bout of the evening, defeating Kaan Hawes via unanimous decision (UD) over three rounds with all three judges scoring the bout 30–27. In his second bout, which served as the semi-finals of the tournament, Conway suffered the first defeat of his career, losing via three-round split decision (SD) against Derrick Osaze. One judge scored the bout 29–28 in favour of Conway while the other two scored it 29–28 to Osaze.

He bounced back from defeat on 25 May with a four-round PTS victory against Harry Matthews, before challenging British super-welterweight champion Ted Cheeseman on 21 June at the York Hall in London. Conway was forced to fight off the back foot for the majority of the fight as Cheeseman took the aggressor's role. After twelve closely contested rounds the bout was ruled a draw to see Cheeseman retain his British title. One judge scored the bout 116–113 in favour of Conway, the second scored it 115–114 to Cheeseman, while the third scored it even at 114–114. The following month it was announced that Conway had signed a promotional contract with Eddie Hearn's Matchroom Boxing.

Conway ended 2019 with PTS victories against Konrad Stempkowski in October and Craig O'Brien in December, before facing his friend and former sparring partner Navid Mansouri for the vacant WBA Inter-Continental super-welterweight title on 14 August 2020 at Matchroom Sport's headquarters in Brentwood, Essex. The first three rounds were evenly contested with both men staying behind their jabs and picking their moments to throw a right hand. Conway began to take a hold of the fight in the fourth, landing a right hand to knock Mansouri into the ropes. The fifth and sixth rounds saw much of the same with Conway finishing the rounds strong. In the seventh, Conway had Mansouri in trouble after landing a two punch combination followed by a flurry of clean punches. Conway pushed for the stoppage in the final few rounds as Mansouri fought defensively. After the final bell rang, Conway was awarded the victory via UD to capture the WBA regional title. One judge scored the bout 99–92 and the other two scored it 98–92.

His final fight of 2020 was originally scheduled to be against Olympic bronze medallist Souleymane Cissokho on 12 December at The SSE Arena in London, with the bout serving as part of the undercard for Anthony Joshua vs. Kubrat Pulev. However, after Cissokho withdrew from the bout due to "administrative issues", Macaulay McGowan was brought in as a late replacement. With the event being televised live on Sky Sports Box Office in the UK and Ireland, and streamed live on DAZN in more than 200 countries, Conway knocked McGowan to the canvas in the eighth round en route to a shutout UD victory over ten rounds. Two judges scored the bout 100–89 and the third scored it 100–90.

Professional boxing record

References

External links

Living people
1996 births
English male boxers
Sportspeople from Northampton
Light-middleweight boxers
Middleweight boxers